Radziemice  is a village in Proszowice County, Lesser Poland Voivodeship, in southern Poland. It is the seat of the gmina (administrative district) called Gmina Radziemice.

References

Villages in Proszowice County